The Coburger Fuchsschaf (also known as Coburg Fox Sheep) is a breed of domestic sheep from Germany. It is characterized by its reddish brown to golden color, which is most pronounced at birth, but remains at the head and the legs in the adult. Many animals also have a dorsal stripe. 

From the 19th century to the early 20th century, this breed was abundant.  However, after World War II, the Coburger Fuchsschaf was nearly extinct.  Today, flocks of this breed are mostly employed for landscape preservation.

History 
After World War II, a German breeder publicized the positive traits of the Coburger Fuchsschaf.  This renewed interest laid the foundation for the breed's continued existence.  In the early 1980s, there were only two registered breeds of Coburger Fuchsschaf.  By 1993, there were 34 breeders and over 1,200 breeding ewes and over 50 breeding rams.  The breed was officially recognized in 1996.

Breed standards 
In 1982, the following breed standards were adopted.
 Rams - 
 Ewes - 
 Both sexes are to be polled (hornless)
 Legs are both golden or red-brown and free of wool
 Ears are broad and long
 Head is noble looking with a slight Roman nose profile.

Characteristics 
The Coburger Fuchsschaf is brown (unicolored) with a red head. On average, ewes have 2 lambs per litter. Rams produce  and ewes produce  of wool yearly.

References 

Sheep breeds originating in Germany
Sheep breeds
Animal breeds on the GEH Red List